Cilicia was one of the most important regions of the Middle East throughout history, who hosted the Hittite, Hellenistic, Roman, Armenian, and Islamic civilizations.  Historically many people considered it as a part of the Levant, and during what is called the Rashidun Caliphate, much of its area was titled with the arabic name "Ath-Thugur As-Shamiyya"-carrying the meaning Levantine outskirts.

Early history

Cilicia was settled from the Neolithic period onwards. Dating of the ancient settlements of the region from Neolithic to Bronze Age is as follows: Aceramic/Neolithic: 8th and 7th millennia BC; Early Chalcolithic: 5800 BC; Middle Chalcolithic (correlated with Halaf and Ubaid developments in the east): c. 5400–4500 BC; Late Chalcolithic: 4500–c. 3400 BC; Early Bronze Age IA: 3400–3000 BC; EBA IB: 3000–2700 BC; EBA II: 2700–2400 BC; EBA III A-B: 2400–2000 BC.

The area had been known as Kizzuwatna in the earlier Hittite era (2nd millennium BC). The region was divided into two parts, Uru Adaniya (flat Cilicia), a well-watered plain, and Tarza or "rough" Cilicia, in the mountainous west.

The Cilicians appear as Hilikku in Assyrian inscriptions, and in the early part of the first millennium BC were one of the four chief powers of Western Asia. Homer mentions the plain as the "Aleian plain" in which Bellerophon wandered, but he transferred the Cilicians far to the west and north and made them allies of Troy. The Cilician cities unknown to Homer already bore their pre-Greek names: Tarzu (Tarsus), Ingira (Anchiale), Danuna-Adana, which retains its ancient name, Pahri (perhaps Mopsuestia), Kundu (Kyinda, then Anazarbus) and Azatiwataya (today's Karatepe).

There exists evidence that circa 1650 BC both Hittite kings Hattusili I and Mursili I enjoyed freedom of movement along the Pyramus River (now the Ceyhan River in southern Turkey) during their wars with Syria, proving they exerted a strong control over Cilicia. After the death of Murshili around 1595 BC, Hurrians wrestled control from the Hitties, and Cilicia was free for two centuries. The first king of free Cilicia, Išputahšu, son of Pariyawatri, was recorded as a "great king" in both cuneiform and Hittite hieroglyphs. Another record of Hittite origins, a treaty between Išputahšu and Telipinu, king of the Hittites, is recorded in both Hittite and Akkadian.

In the next century, Cilician king Pilliya finalized treaties with both King Zidanta II of the Hittites and Idrimi of Alalakh, in which Idrimi mentions that he had assaulted several military targets throughout Eastern Cilicia. Niqmepa, who succeeded Idrimi as king of Alalakh, went so far as to ask for help from a Hurrian rival, Shaushtatar of Mitanni, to try and reduce Cilicia's power in the region. It was soon apparent, however, that increased Hittite power would soon prove Niqmepa's efforts to be futile, as the city of Kizzuwatna soon fell to the Hittites, threatening all of Cilicia. Soon after, King Sunassura II was forced to accept vassalization under the Hittites, becoming the last king of ancient Cilicia.

In the 13th century BC a major population shift occurred as the Sea Peoples overran Cilicia. The Hurrians who resided there deserted the area and moved northeast towards the Taurus Mountains, where they settled in the area of Cappadocia.

In the 8th century BC, the region was unified under the rule of the dynasty of Mukšuš, whom the Greeks rendered Mopsos and credited as the founder of Mopsuestia, though the capital was Adana. Mopsuestia's multicultural character is reflected in the bilingual inscriptions of the ninth and eighth centuries, written both in Indo-European hieroglyphic Luwian and West Semitic Phoenician.

In the ninth century BC it became part of Assyria and remained so until the late seventh century BC.

Kingdom of Cilicia
 
Cilicians could manage to protect themselves from Assyrian domination and, with the dissolution of the Neo-Assyrian Empire in 612 BC, they established their fully independent kingdom. As being at a  strategically significant geographic location, Cilicians could manage to expand their kingdom as far north as Halys River in a short period. With the expansion, the kingdom became as strong as Babylonia, one of the powerhouses of the time.

In 585 BC, Herodotus praised Cilician king Syennesis I, the founder of the kingdom, for his efforts in leading negotiations in ending the 5-years war between Lydia and the Median Kingdom.

War broke out between the two countries and continued for five years, during which both the Lydians and Medes won a number of victories. On one occasion they had an unexpected battle in the dark, an event which occurred after five years of indecisive warfare. The two armies had already engaged and the fight was in progress, when the day was suddenly turned into night. [...] Both Lydians and Medes broke off the engagement when they saw this darkening of the day; they were more anxious than they had been to conclude peace, and a reconciliation was brought about by Syennesis, a Cilician, and Labynetus of Babylon, who were the men responsible both for the pact to keep the peace and for the exchange of marriages between the two kingdoms. They persuaded Alyattes to give his daughter Aryenis to Astyages, son of Cyaxares - knowing that treaties seldom remain intact without powerful sanctions.

Peaceful governance conducted by the Syennesis dynasty not only helped the kingdom survive, but also prevented the Achaemenid Empire to attacks the Lydians after the Persian invasions of Median lands. Appuašu, the son of Syennessis, defended the country against the Babylonian king Neriglissar, whose army reached Cilicia and crossed the Taurus mountain range. The Achaemenids eventually managed to defeat the Lydians, thus Appuašu had to recognize the authority of the Persians in 549 BC to keep the local administration with the Cilicians. Cilicia became an autonomous satrapy under the reign of Cyrus II.

Cilicians were independent in their internal affairs and kept this autonomy for almost 150 years. In 401, Syennesis III and his wife Epyaxa supported the revolt of Cyrus the Younger against his brother Artaxerxes II Mnemon. This was sound policy, because otherwise, Cilicia would have been looted by the rebel army. However, after the defeat of Cyrus at Cunaxa, Syennesis' position was difficult. Most scholars assume that this behavior marked the end of Cilician autonomy, and after 400 BC it became a normal satrapy.

Satrapy of the Achaemenid empire of Persia 

Under the Persian empire Cilicia (in ) was apparently governed by tributary native kings who bore a Hellenized name or the title of "Syennesis", but it was officially included in the fourth satrapy by Darius. Xenophon found a queen in power, and no opposition was offered to the march of Cyrus the Younger.

The great highway from the west existed before Cyrus conquered Cilicia. On its long rough descent from the Anatolian plateau to Tarsus, it ran through the narrow pass between walls of rock called the Cilician Gates. After crossing the low hills east of the Pyramus it passed through a masonry (Cilician) gate, Demir Kapu, and entered the plain of Issus. From that plain one road ran southward through another masonry (Syrian) gate to Alexandretta, and thence crossed Mt. Amanus by the Syrian Gate, Beilan Pass, eventually to Antioch and Syria. Another road ran northwards through a masonry (Armenian) gate, south of Toprak Kale, and crossed Mt. Amanus by the Armenian Gate, Baghche Pass, to northern Syria and the Euphrates. By the last pass, which was apparently unknown to Alexander, Darius crossed the mountains prior to the battle of Issus. Both passes are short and easy and connect Cilicia Pedias geographically and politically with Syria rather than with Anatolia.

Satrapy of the Empire of Alexander
Alexander forded the Halys River in the summer of 333 BC, ending up on the border of southeastern Phrygia and Cilicia. He knew well the writings of Xenophon, and how the Cilician Gates had been "impassable if obstructed by the enemy". Alexander reasoned that by force alone he could frighten the defenders and break through, and he gathered his men to do so. In the cover of night they attacked, startling the guards and sending them and their satrap into full flight, setting their crops aflame as they made for Tarsus. This good fortune allowed Alexander and his army to pass unharmed through the Gates and into Cilicia.

After Alexander's death it was long a battleground of rival Hellenistic monarchs and kingdoms, and for a time fell under Ptolemaic dominion (i.e., Egypt), but finally came to the Seleucids, who, however, never held effectually more than the eastern half. During the Hellenistic era, numerous cities were established in Cilicia, which minted coins showing the badges (gods, animals and objects) associated with each polis.

Roman/Byzantine Cilicia 
 

Cilicia Trachea became the haunt of pirates, who were subdued by Pompey in 67 BC following a Battle of Korakesion (modern Alanya), and Tarsus was made the capital of the Roman province of Cilicia. Cilicia Pedias became Roman territory in 103 BC first conquered by Marcus Antonius Orator in his campaign against pirates, with Sulla acting as its first governor, foiling an invasion of Mithridates, and the whole was organized by Pompey, 64 BC, into a province which, for a short time, extended to and included part of Phrygia.

It was reorganized by Julius Caesar, 47 BC, and about 27 BC became part of the province Syria-Cilicia Phoenice. At first the western district was left independent under native kings or priest-dynasts, and a small kingdom, under Tarcondimotus I, was left in the east; but these were finally united to the province by Vespasian, AD 72. Containing 47 known cities, it had been deemed important enough to be governed by a proconsul.

Under Emperor Diocletian's Tetrarchy (c. 297), Cilicia was governed by a consularis; with Isauria and the Syrian, Mesopotamian, Egyptian and Libyan provinces, formed the Diocesis Orientis (in the late 4th century the African component was split off as Diocese of Egypt), part of the pretorian prefecture also called Oriens ('the East', also including the dioceses of Asiana and Pontica, both in Anatolia, and Thraciae in the Balkans), the rich bulk of the eastern Roman Empire.

Roman Cilicia exported the goats-hair cloth, Cilicium, which was used to make tents. Tarsus was also the birthplace of the early Christian missionary and author St. Paul, likely writer of 13 of the 27 books included in the New Testament.

Cilicia had numerous Christian communities and is mentioned six times in the Book of Acts and once in the Epistle to the Galatians (1:21). After Christianity became the official religion of the Roman Empire in the 4th century, Cilicia was included in the territories of the patriarchate of Antioch. The region was divided into two civil and ecclesiastical provinces: Cilicia Prima, with a metropolitan diocese at Tarsus and suffragan dioceses for Pompeiopolis, Sebaste, Augusta, Corycus, Adana, Mallus and Zephyrium; and Cilicia Secunda, with a metropolitan diocese at Anazarbus and suffragan dioceses for Mopsuestia, Aegae, Epiphania, Irenopolis, Flavias, Castabala, Alexandria, Citidiopolis and Rhosus. Bishops from the various dioceses of Cilicia were well represented at the First Council of Nicaea in 325 and at the later ecumenical councils.

After the division of the Roman Empire, Cilicia became part of the eastern Roman Empire, the Byzantine Empire.

Caliphates in Cilicia
In the 7th century Cilicia was invaded by the Muslim Arabs. The area was for some time an embattled no-man's land. The Arabs succeeded in conquering the area in the early 8th century. Under the Abbasid Caliphate, Cilicia was resettled and transformed into a fortified frontier zone (thughur). Tarsus, re-built in 787/788, quickly became the largest settlement in the region and the Arabs' most important base in their raids across the Taurus Mountains into Byzantine-held Anatolia.

The Muslims held the country until it was reoccupied by the Emperor Nicephorus II in 965. From this period onward, the area increasingly came to be settled by Armenians, especially as Imperial rule pushed deeper into the Caucasus over the course of the 11th century.

Armenian Kingdom 

During the time of the First Crusade, the area was controlled by the Armenian Kingdom of Cilicia. The Seljuk Turkish invasions of Armenia were followed by an exodus of Armenians migrating westward into the Byzantine Empire, and in 1080 Ruben, a relative of the last king of Ani, founded in the heart of the Cilician Taurus a small principality which gradually expanded into the Armenian Kingdom of Cilicia. This Christian state, surrounded by Muslim states hostile to its existence, had a stormy history of about 300 years, giving valuable support to the Crusaders, and trading with the great commercial cities of Italy.

It prospered for three centuries due to the vast network of fortifications which secured all the major roads as well as the three principal harbours at Ayas, Koŕikos, and Mopsuestia. Through their complex alliances with the Crusader states the Armenian barons and kings often invited the Crusaders to maintain castles in and along the borders of the Kingdom, including Bagras, Trapessac, T‛il Hamtun, Harunia, Selefkia, Amouda, and Sarvandikar.

Gosdantin (r. 1095 – c. 1100) assisted the crusaders on their march to Antioch, and was created knight and marquis. Thoros I (r. c. 1100 – 1129), in alliance with the Christian princes of Syria, waged successful wars against the Byzantines and Seljuk Turks. Levon II (Leo the Great (r. 1187–1219)), extended the kingdom beyond Mount Taurus and established the capital at Sis. He assisted the crusaders, was crowned King by the Archbishop of Mainz, and married one of the Lusignans of the crusader kingdom Cyprus.

Hetoum I (r. 1226–1270) made an alliance with the Mongols, sending his brother Sempad to the Mongol court in person. The Mongols then assisted with the defense of Cilicia from the Mamluks of Egypt, until the Mongols themselves converted to Islam. When Levon V died (1342), John of Lusignan was crowned king as Gosdantin IV; but he and his successors alienated the native Armenians by attempting to make them conform to the Roman Church, and by giving all posts of honor to Latins, until at last the kingdom, falling prey to internal dissensions, ceded Cilia Pedias to Ramadanid-supported Mamluk Sultanate in 1375. Karamanid Principality one of the Turkmen Anatolian beyliks emerged after the collapse of the Anatolian Seljuks took over the rule of Cilicia Thracea.

Ramadanid Emirate
 

The Ilkhanate lost cohesion after the death of Abu Sa'id, thus could not support Armenian Kingdom in guarding Cilicia. Internal conflicts within Armenian Kingdom and the devastation caused by the Black Death that arrived in 1348, made nomadic Türkmens to turn their eyes to unstable Cilicia. In 1352, Ramazan Beg led Turkmens settled south of Çaldağı and founded their first settlement, Camili. Later that year, Ramazan Beg visited Cairo and was assented by the Sultan to establish the new frontier Turkmen Emirate in Cilicia. Yüreğir Türkmens lived as a small community for 7 years in southeast of Adana, and named their new land, Yüreğir. In 1359, Mamluk Sultanate Army marched into Cilicia and took over Adana and Tarsus, two major cities of the plain, leaving few castles to Armenians.In 1375, Mamluks gained the control of the remaining areas of Cilicia, thus ending the three centuries rule of Armenians. Mamluk Sultanate authorized Ramazan Beg led Türkmen Emirate to administer Cilicia, but took direct control of the towns, Tarsus, Ayas, Sarvandikar, Sis at the four corners of Cilicia plain and appointed an Amir and a Garrison for each. Tarsus, the former capital of Cilicia, were settled by the moors that arrived from Egypt. Türkmen Emirate which began to be known as Ramadanids, set the city of Adana as their center of power, and many Türkmen families of Yüreğir origin moved to the city.

After the death of Ramazan Bey, his son Ibrahim Bey made alliance with the Karaman Emirate. Alaeddin Bey and Ibrahim Bey together tried to break the Mameluks' might in the province. After this alliance a great Mameluk army moved in and began to plunder but Ibrahim Bey's army achieved a great victory against the Mameluks in Belen. Also in this battle Temur Bey, the general of the Mameluks, had been captured. Yilboga, the amir of Aleppo moved on to the Turkmens after this defeat and he conquered Misis Castle.
 
Ramadanids were the only emirate in Anatolia that were not a successor of the Anatolian Seljuk Sultanate. They are often misclassified as an Anatolian beylik, though they were an entity under Mamluks. The Ramadanids played an important role in 15th century Ottoman-Mamluk relations, being a buffer state located in the Mamluk al-'Awasim frontier zone. Cilicia were one of the last regions of Anatolia to fall under Turkish rule, and were part of the Seljuqs for a short time, thus were not effected from Sunni tariqa expansionism of the 13th century.  Yüreğir Turks moved to Cilicia in the late 14th century, and had a distinct culture that influenced from Bektashi traditions which accompanied Shamanic rituals with Islam. Living together and having cultural exchange with the large Armenian community, Yüreğir Turks flourished a laid back culture.

In 1516, Selim I incorporated the beylik into the Ottoman Empire after his conquest of the Mamluk state. The beys of Ramadanids held the administration of the Ottoman sanjak of Adana in a hereditary manner until 1608, with the last 92 years as a vassal of the Ottomans.

Ottoman Empire 
 

Ottomans ended the Ramadanid administration of Adana sanjak in 1608, and ruled it directly from Constantinople then after. The autonomous sanjak was then split from the Aleppo Eyalet and established as a new province under the name of Adana Eyalet. A governor was appointed to administer the province. In late 1832, Eyalet of Egypt Vali Muhammad Ali Pasha invaded Syria, and reached Cilicia. The Convention of Kütahya that was signed on 14 May 1833, ceded Cilicia to the de facto independent Egypt. Alawites brought to Cilicia from Syria to work at the flourishing agricultural lands. İbrahim Paşa, the son of Muhammed Ali Paşa, demolished the Adana Castle and the city walls in 1836. He built the canals for irrigation and transportation and also built water systems for the residential areas of the towns. Adana had the infrastructure it needed by the second half of the 19th century to become major center of Southeastern Anatolia. After the Oriental crisis, the Convention of Alexandria that was signed on 27 November 1840,  required the return of Cilicia to Ottoman sovereignty. The American Civil War that broke down in 1861, disturbed the cotton flow to Europe and directed European cotton traders to fertile Cilicia. The region became the center of cotton trade and one of the most economically strong regions of the Empire within decades. Many Armenians, Turkish, Greeks, Jewish and Alawites moved to Cilicia from all over the Empire.  In 1869, Adana Eyalet was re-established as Adana Vilayet, after the re-structuring in the Ottoman Administration. Adana–Mersin railway line was opened in 1886, connecting Cilicia to international ports through Port of Mersin.

Thriving regional economy, doubling of Cilician Armenian population due to flee from Hamidian massacres, the end of autocratic Abdulhamid rule with the revolution of 1908, empowered the Armenian community and envisioned an autonomous Cilicia. Enraged supporters of Abdulhamid that organized under Cemiyet-i Muhammediye amidst the countercoup, led to a series of anti-Armenian pogroms in 14–27 April 1909. The Adana massacre resulted in the deaths of roughly 25,000 Armenians, orphanized 3500 children and caused heavy destruction of Christian neighborhoods in the entire Vilayet.

Cilicia section of the Berlin–Baghdad railway were opened in 1912, connecting the region to Middle East. Over the course of Armenian genocide, Ottoman telegraph was received by the Governor to deport the more than 70,000 Armenians of the Adana Vilayet to Syria. The Armenians of Zeitun had organized a successful resistance against the Ottoman onslaught. In order to finally subjugate Zeitun, the Ottomans had to resort to treachery by forcing an Armenian delegation from Marash to ask the Zeituntsi-s to put down their arms. Both the Armenian delegation, and later, the inhabitants of Zeitun, were left with no choice.

French Cilicia
Armistice of Mudros that was signed on 30 October 1918 to end the World War I, ceded the control of Cilicia to France. French Government sent four battalions of the Armenian Legion in December to take over and oversee the repatriation of more than 170,000 Armenians to Cilicia. Returning Armenians negotiated with France to establish an autonomous State of Cilicia. The Armenians formed the Armenian National Union which acted as an unofficial Cilician Armenian government composed of the four major political parties and three Armenian religious denominations. Mihran Damadian, the chief negotiator for Armenians, signed the provisional Constitution of Cilicia in 1919 to bring new order to the region.

The French forces were spread too thinly in the region and, as they came under withering attacks by Muslim elements both opposed and loyal to Mustafa Kemal Pasha, eventually reversed their policies in the region. A truce arranged on May 28 between the French and the Kemalists, led to the retreat of the French forces south of the Mersin-Osmaniye railroad. The subsequent evacuation of thousands of Armenians from Sis and its environs and their migration to Adana, raised the number of Armenians in the city to more than 100,000 and filled the city with refugee camps. On 10 July 1920, to ease the overpopulated south of the railroad, a Franco-Armenian operation forced the local Turkish population to escape north. Roughly 40,000 Turks from Adana and around fled to the country and to the mountains north, an event known as Kaç Kaç incident, which lasted 4 days and claimed hundreds of lives. Mihran Damadian declared the autonomy of Cilicia on 5 August 1920, by coming to a consensus with the ethnic communities of the city. French government, however, did not recognize the autonomy and dissolved the Armenian Legion and maintained their control over the region.

With the changing political environment and interests, French further reversed their policy: The repatriation was halted, and the French ultimately abandoned all pretensions to Cilicia, which they had originally hoped to attach to their mandate over Syria. Cilicia Peace Treaty was signed on 9 March 1921 between France and Turkish Grand National Assembly. The treaty did not achieve the intended goals and was replaced with the Treaty of Ankara that was signed on 20 October 1921. Based on the terms of the agreement, France recognized the end of the Cilicia War, and French troops together with the remaining Armenian volunteers withdrew from the region in early January 1922. Maronite community were re-settled in Lebanon by the French Administration. Later in 1922, roughly 10,000 Greeks were erforced to move to Greece by the policy of Greco-Turkish population exchange. Cilicia Armenians settled in Lebanon, at the newly founded Armenian Bourj Hammoud town, just north-east of Beirut. From 1920s, around 60 percent of the Cilician Armenians moved to Argentina. An informal census of 1941 revealed that, 70 percent of all the Armenian Argentines in Buenos Aires had Adana origins.

Cilicia in Turkey 
The region become part of the Republic of Turkey in 1921 with the signing of the Treaty of Ankara. On 15 April 1923, just before the signing of the Treaty of Lausanne, the Turkish government enacted the "Law of Abandoned Properties" which confiscated properties of Armenians and Greeks who were not present on their property. Cilicia were one of the regions with the most confiscated property, thus muhacirs (en:immigrants) from Balkans and Crete were relocated in the old Armenian and Greek neighborhoods and villages of the region. All types of properties, lands, houses and workshops were distributed to them. Also during this period, there was a property rush of Muslims from Kayseri and Darende to Cilicia who were granted the ownership of large farms, factories, stores and mansions. Within a decade, Cilicia had a sharp change demographically, socially and economically and lost its diversity by turning into solely Muslim/Turkish. Remaining Jews and Christians were hit by the heavy burden of the Wealth Tax in 1942, which caused them to leave Cilicia, selling their properties for peanuts to families like Sabancı, who built their wealth on owning confiscated or cheaply purchased properties. Forcible change in means of production led to abuse of wealth and harsh treatment of labor later in the 20th century, as the new possessors did not have the necessary management attributes that the previous owners had for centuries.

See also 
 Ancient regions of Anatolia
 Armenian Catholic Patriarch of Cilicia
 Catholicos of Cilicia
 Notitia dignitatum

References

Further reading 
 Pilhofer, Philipp. 2018. Das frühe Christentum im kilikisch-isaurischen Bergland. Die Christen der Kalykadnos-Region in den ersten fünf Jahrhunderten (PDF; 27,4 MB) (Texte und Untersuchungen zur Geschichte der altchristlichen Literatur, vol. 184). Berlin/Boston: De Gruyter.
 Bulletin of the American Schools of Oriental Research, No. 282/283, Symposium: Chalcolithic Cyprus. pp. 167–175.
 Engels, David. 2008. "Cicéron comme proconsul en Cilicie et la guerre contre les Parthes", Revue Belge de Philologie et d'Histoire 86, pp. 23–45.
 Pilhofer, Susanne. 2006. Romanisierung in Kilikien? Das Zeugnis der Inschriften (Quellen und Forschungen zur Antiken Welt 46). Munich: Herbert Utz Verlag. And: 2., erweiterte Auflage, mit einem Nachwort von Philipp Pilhofer (Quellen und Forschungen zur Antiken Welt 60) Munich: Herbert Utz Verlag

External links
 Ancient Cilicia - texts, photographs, maps, inscriptions
 Jona Lendering, "Ancient Cilicia"
 Cilicia
 Photographs and Plans of the Churches and Fortifications in the Armenian Kingdom of Cilicia
 Pilgrimages to Historic Armenia and Cilicia
 WorldStatesmen- Turkey
 Armenian Genocide Map's - Map of Kilikia (1909)

 
History of Adana Province